Copalis Crossing is an unincorporated community in Grays Harbor County, Washington, United States. Copalis Crossing has a post office with ZIP code 98536.

References

Unincorporated communities in Grays Harbor County, Washington
Unincorporated communities in Washington (state)